Acción mutante is a 1993 science fiction black comedy film co-written and directed by Álex de la Iglesia.

Plot
A future post-apocalyptic world is ruled by the good-looking people. A terrorist group of disabled people, who see themselves as mutants, take arms against their oppressors. They plan to rid the world of "beautiful people" and superficiality. They are very inept at what they do and mistrust one another. They assassinate body builders, massacre an aerobics class on live TV and blow up a sperm bank as part of their violent campaign.

Led by their chief Ramón Yarritu (Antonio Resines), they plan their final hit before retirement; the kidnap of Patricia Orujo (Frédérique Feder), the daughter and only heiress of billionaire businessman Lord Orujo (Fernando Guillén), the plan involves kidnapping the girl in the middle of her wedding but the scene becomes a massacre when the girl cuts the cake with a large sharp knife puncturing the chest of one of the terrorists that was hidden inside of it, badly hurt he opens the cake top and open fire on the alarmed and unsuspecting attendees, 2 members of the terrorist group are killed in the middle of the fray but the rest manage to flee with Patricia as their hostage. They staple Patricia's lips together with a special electronic device and escape from the police in their spaceship whose disguised as a gigantic fish merchant ship.

Ramón, planning to keep the ransom money for himself, hides from the group that the amount set for the exchange is 100 million and declares its only 10 million, the gang accidentally watches a news flash report where the correct amount to be delivered by the girl's family is revealed, the gang gets upset and summons Ramón to explain the misinformation but he turns the gang members against each other by convincing them there is a traitor on board the ship and that is part of the crew.

His scheme and plot leads to the deaths of all the crewmen/henchmen of the gang seemingly accidentally each time a member was murdered by Ramón himself, while killing the last one of the terrorists - Juan (Juan Viadas), who has a siamese twin .. Álex (Álex Angulo), he is discovered and a fierce fight starts culminating in the destruction of the guidance system of the ship.  They crash on a planet called Axturiax, a brutal and forgotten mining planet inhabited only by male crazed, sex-starved miners because all women had died. Ramón and Patricia, who has developed Stockholm syndrome, are captured by miners but manage to escape, but not before they attempt to gang-rape her, Álex survives the crash too and after he friendlies with a blind experienced miner, he decides to pursue Ramón to avenge his death brother and to rescue Patricia, he must drag the attached dead body of his brother Juan around with him for the rest of the film, A planned ransom drop trick by Orujo turns into mayhem, when a portable nuclear device is activated by lord Orujo to wipe clean the whole area, the event is compounded by live TV coverage for the ransom negotiations when Álex arrives and kills Lord Orujo with a headshot, initiating a dogfight inside the bar that goes to its climax when the police forces join the show and Ramón decides to sacrifice himself to allow Patricia escape and survive the bar fight with the police forces outside ... greeting Patricia with a French kiss and Álex by telling him he is still useless, he uses Lord Orujo mini nuke to evaporate the police army outside entrance while the bar trembles and crumbles due to the mini nuke shockwave.

When the nuclear blast is over Álex finally gets rid of his siamese twin attached body and finds Patricia hidden below a metal cage that saved her, they hold each other in order to ready a machine gun and get outside the destroyed bar.

Cast

Production 
A Spain-France co-production, Acción mutante was produced by El Deseo and CIBY 2000. The film was shot in Erandio, Biscay.

Release 
The film premiered in Bilbao and Madrid on 3 February 1993.

References 
Citations

Bibliography

External links 
 
 

1993 films
1993 action comedy films
1990s science fiction comedy films
Films directed by Álex de la Iglesia
Films set in the future
Films set in 2012
1990s Spanish-language films
Spanish science fiction comedy films
1990s science fiction action films
Films about terrorism in Europe
Films set on fictional planets
Spanish black comedy films
Films with screenplays by Jorge Guerricaechevarría
Films produced by Agustín Almodóvar
Guerrilla warfare in film
Films set in the Basque County
El Deseo films
1990s Spanish films